Steve Brudniak (born April 9, 1961, Topeka, Kansas) is an American artist, actor, filmmaker and musician. Known for highly crafted and unusual assemblage sculpture, his visual art career spans nearly four decades. His music, acting and filmmaking endeavors emerged during childhood escalating professionally in recent years. Brudniak spent his elementary and high school years in Houston, Texas eventually moving to Austin, Texas, where he currently lives.

Art

Brudniak's art incorporates, often pioneering, unconventional media and scientific elements such as high voltage electricity, Tesla coil technology, magnetic ferrofluid, gyro mechanics, biological preservations, fiber optics, and lasers.

He integrates disparate found objects in the construction of his art, however the finished pieces do not resemble collage. The assemblages generally give the appearance of being functional machines or ritualistic objects that are indivisibly "of a piece," albeit of indiscernible origin and purpose. Spirituality, psychology, and biology are common themes in his work.

In 2008 his Astrogeneris Mementos became the first assemblage sculptures exhibited in outer space, taken aboard the International Space Station by entrepreneur and astronaut Richard Garriott.

During the 1980s Brudniak was an active member of the Houston Alternative Art scene, working from several studios in the historical Heights neighborhood and represented by four different galleries during this time. In 1988 he moved to his Bouldin Creek, Austin, Texas art studio in Austin, Texas continuing to produce art that has been exhibited in over 100 gallery and museum exhibitions.

Brudniak's work is included in the collections of The Museum of Fine Arts, Houston, The San Antonio Museum of Art, the El Paso Museum of Art, and The Art Museum of South Texas at Corpus Christi. He is currently represented by the Davis Gallery in Austin, Texas.

His Treatise, Saving Beauty: The Painful Rebirthing of Visual Aesthetic in Contemporary Art, is a scolding commentary on the diminishing importance of visual beauty and craft in postmodern, contemporary art.

Art Books and Documentaries
The monograph, The Science of Surrealism - Assemblage Sculpture of Steve Brudniak was published in 2013 documenting thirty years of the artist's career in photos, essays and commentary. It was edited by Anjali Gupta, with a foreword by Guillermo del Toro. Books and documentaries featuring Brudniak's work are listed in the bibliography below.

Acting and Film
Brudniak began acting in and directing his own short films at the age of 13 and has appeared in dozens of films, notably Richard Linklater's Waking Life and Robert Rodriguez Red 11; in video production and television shows including the Reelz Channels Murder Made Me Famous, AMC's The Son and El Rey Network's Rebel Without a Crew. In 2009 he produced, acted in and co-directed Eric Frodsham's Moments The Go feature film. He has appeared in advertising for Texas Tourism, Capital One, Indian Motorcycle, Cox Business and others. (Filmography Below)

Music
In 1976 he and guitar player Gerry Diaz formed the psychedelic rock group Spiny Normen and recorded an album at the Alvin Community College which was released decades later on RidingEasy Records in 2018.

In 1981 he opened the Victorian Recording Studio in Houston, recording many of Houston's alternative, metal, folk, skate and punk groups. He also recorded and performed in several bands there and later in Austin. He continues to record with Diaz in an experimental effort called Psylobison, playing theremin and Wavetech sound wave generator. (Discography Below)

Bibliography

Bunch, Robert Craig, The Art of Found Objects: Interviews with Texas Artists. College Station, TX: Texas A&M University Press, 2016.

Chemeketa College Art Faculty. Art for Everyone, Salem, Oregon: Chemeketa Press, 2016.

Gupta, Anjali ed., The Science of Surrealism - Assemblage Sculpture of Steve Brudniak. Austin TX: Merrid Zone, 2013

Brenner, Wayne Alan. Minerva’s Wreck: Austin Arts Anthology, Austin TX: Café Armageddon, 2010.

Branwyn, Gareth. Device Volume 2: Reconstructed, San Diego, CA: IDW Publishing, July 2009.

Reese, Becky Duval. Texas 100: Selections from the El Paso Museum of Art, El Paso, TX: El Paso Museum of Art Foundation, 2006.
 
Otten, William G. and Michelle W. Locke. The Legacy Continues, Corpus Christi, TX: Art Museum of South Texas, 2006.

Morton, Jennifer. Belong: A TV Journalist's Search for Urban Culture: from Beirut to Bamako, from Havana to Ho Chi Minh City: Stories and Photos. Toronto, Ontario, Canada: Insomniac Press, 2004.

Greene, Alison de Lima. Texas: 150 Works from the Museum of Fine Arts. NY, NY: Harry N. Abrams, October 1, 2000.

Hendricks, Patricia D. and Becky Duval Reese. A Century of Sculpture in Texas 1889-1989. Austin, TX: University of Texas Press, 1989.
 
McEvilley, Thomas. Another Reality. Houston, TX: Hooks-Epstein Galleries, June 1989.

Video Documentary Bibliography

Ulteriaphobia: The Art of Steve Brudniak. Dir. Luke Savisky. Austin, TX: Klaus und Hans Productions, 1995, Video documentary.

Indie Live Austin. “Steve Brudniak: Interview with Diana Brochin.” Austin, TX: ACTV, January 2010.

Steve Brudniak – Noumenon. Dir. Wiley Wiggins. Austin, TX: 2008, Video documentary.

Steve Brudniak. Dir. Andrew Nourse. Austin, TX: Andy Nourse Productions, 1998 Video documentary.

Filmography

Film

Television

Voice Over

Discography
Albums

Spiny Normen. Spiny Normen. RidingEasy Records. 2018 (Recorded 1979)

Singles

Spiny Normen. The Sound of Younger Times. Brining It All Back Again
(Compilation). Shroom Angel Records. 2010 (Recorded 1979)

Spiny Normen. The Bell Park Loon. Brown Acid: The Second Trip (Compilation). RidingEasy Records. 2016 (Recorded 1979)

Citations

External links
Artists Website (Includes resume and links to reviews)
Actor Website
Book Website

YouTube Channel
Spiny Normen Article
71 Magazine Interview
Art Book Guy Interview

Living people
1961 births
American multimedia artists
20th-century American sculptors
Artists from Topeka, Kansas
21st-century American sculptors